Constantin Reiner (born 11 July 1997) is an Austrian professional footballer who plays as a centre-back for Piast Gliwice.

External links
 

1997 births
Living people
Austrian footballers
Association football defenders
USK Anif players
SV Ried players
Piast Gliwice players
2. Liga (Austria) players
Austrian Football Bundesliga players
Ekstraklasa players
Austrian expatriate footballers
Expatriate footballers in Poland
Austrian expatriate sportspeople in Poland
People from Salzburg-Umgebung District